The Tornado is an amusement ride manufactured by Wisdom Industries Ltd. Most Tornadoes travel with a traveling midway company to many fairs with many other rides.

Ride experience 
The center base spins at 14 RPM while each car can be spun by the riders. Then, the ride tilts at a 24 degree angle, while spinning.

Incidents 
On March 29, 2003, a Tornado ride collapsed, injuring 4 children, at the Lehigh Spring Festival in Lehigh Acres, Florida.  Witnesses say that one of the gondolas clipped the ground, causing the central column to break off its axis.  The ride was the second in a chain of accidents on the Midwest Midways traveling carnival.

On August 13, 2006, two children each suffered a broken arm and were taken by ambulance to a local hospital, where they were treated and released. The accident happened as the children were using the car's wheel to spin the car. Their hands became tangled and somehow wrapped around the pole above the wheel.  The ride was operated by Butler Amusements.

Amusement ride manufacturers